Haywood is a surname, and may refer to

 Adam Haywood, (1875–1932), English footballer
 "Big" Bill Haywood, (1869–1928), American union organizer
 Bill Haywood (baseball), (born 1937), American baseball player and coach
 Billy Haywood, (1899–1977), English footballer
 Brendan Haywood, American basketball player
 Chris Haywood, American film and television actor and producer
 Eliza Haywood, (1693–1756), English writer, actress and publisher
 Esme Haywood, (1900–1985), English cricketer
Dave Haywood (born 1982), American musician
 Garfield Thomas Haywood, (1880–1931) African American pastor and song writer
 Hurley Haywood, American race-car driver
 John Haywood (disambiguation)
 Kate Haywood, English swimmer
Kalan Haywood, American politician
 Leah Haywood, Australian pop rock singer
 Leon Haywood, American funk and soul singer
 Harry Haywood, (1898–1985), African American communist
 Michael Haywood, American college football coach
 Mirabelle Haywood (Magical DoReMi), anime character from the television series Ojamajo Doremi
 Nick Haywood, American jazz musician
 Nigel Haywood, British diplomat
 Pippa Haywood, English actress
  Ryan Haywood, American Niger
 Sam Haywood, British pianist
 Spencer Haywood, American basketball player
 Sue Haywood, American mountain bike racer
 William Henry Haywood, Jr. (1801–1852), American U.S. senator

See also 

 Harewood (surname)
 Heawood
 Harwood (name)

English-language surnames
Surnames of English origin
Surnames of British Isles origin